Elton 60 – Live at Madison Square Garden is a 2-disc DVD release, starring Elton John performing some of his biggest hits and even several fan favourites. The release features appearances onstage by comedians Robin Williams and Whoopi Goldberg, as well as special remarks to the audience by lyricist Bernie Taupin. The concert was recorded on Elton's 60th birthday, 25 March 2007, and coincides with his record-setting 60th concert at Madison Square Garden in New York City.

In addition to his regular band, The Brooklyn Youth Chorus also performs on several songs.

DVD releases
Originally scheduled to be released to DVD in stores on 25 September 2007, it was postponed until 2 October 2007. A 2-DVD and 1-CD box set with the live CD was released on 9 October 2007.

Track listing

Disc One: The Concert
  "Sixty Years On" From Elton John, 1970
 "Madman Across The Water" From Madman Across The Water, 1971
  "Where to Now St. Peter?" From Tumbleweed Connection, 1970
 "Hercules" From Honky Château, 1972
  "Ballad of a Well-Known Gun" From Tumbleweed Connection, 1970
  "Take Me to the Pilot" From Elton John, 1970
 "High Flying Bird" From Don't Shoot Me I'm Only The Piano Player, 1973
 "Holiday Inn" From Madman Across The Water, 1971
  "Burn Down The Mission" From Tumbleweed Connection, 1970
  "Better Off Dead" From Captain Fantastic and the Brown Dirt Cowboy, 1975
  "Levon" From Madman Across The Water, 1971
  "Empty Garden (Hey Hey Johnny)" From Jump Up, 1982

[Happy Birthday Presentation]

 "Daniel" From Don't Shoot Me I'm Only The Piano Player, 1973
  "Honky Cat" From Honky Château, 1972
  "Rocket Man" From Honky Château, 1972
  "I Guess That's Why They Call It The Blues" From Too Low For Zero, 1983
  "The Bridge" From The Captain & the Kid, 2006
 "Roy Rogers" From Goodbye Yellow Brick Road, 1973
  "Mona Lisas and Mad Hatters" From Honky Château, 1972
  "Sorry Seems To Be The Hardest Word" From Blue Moves, 1976
  "Bennie and the Jets" From Goodbye Yellow Brick Road, 1973
  "All the Girls Love Alice" From Goodbye Yellow Brick Road, 1973
  "Tiny Dancer" From Madman Across The Water, 1971
  "Something About The Way You Look Tonight" From The Big Picture, 1997
  "Philadelphia Freedom" From Rock of the Westies, 1975
  "Sad Songs (Say So Much)" From Breaking Hearts, 1984
  "Don't Let The Sun Go Down on Me" From Caribou, 1974
  "I'm Still Standing" From Two Low For Zero, 1983
  "The Bitch Is Back" From Caribou, 1974
  "Crocodile Rock" From Don't Shoot Me I'm Only The Piano Player, 1973
  "Saturday Night's Alright For Fighting" From Goodbye Yellow Brick Road, 1973

Encore:

  "Funeral for a Friend/Love Lies Bleeding" From Goodbye Yellow Brick Road, 1973
  "Your Song" From Elton John, 1970

Disc Two
Live, Rare & Unseen
 "Your Song" (Elton at 50 Montage)
 "Border Song" (Swiss TV, 1970)
 "Sixty Years On" (In Concert, 1970)
 "Tiny Dancer" (Sounds for Saturday, 1971)
 "Levon" (Sounds for Saturday, 1971)
 "Honky Cat" (Royal Festival Hall, 1972)
 "Rocket Man" (Royal Festival Hall, 1972)
 "Crocodile Rock" (Royal Variety Show, 1972)
 "Goodbye Yellow Brick Road" (TOTP, 1973, lip-synched)
 "Daniel" (Edinburgh Playhouse Theatre, 1976)
 "Someone Saved My Life Tonight" (Edinburgh Playhouse Theatre, 1976)
 "Candle in the Wind" (Edinburgh Playhouse Theatre, 1976)
 "Sorry Seems to Be the Hardest Word" (Edinburgh Playhouse Theatre, 1976)
 "I'm Still Standing" (Night & Day Concert, Wembley, 1984)
 "Bennie and the Jets" (Night & Day Concert, Wembley, 1984)
 "Song for Guy" (Thank You Australia Concert, 1984)
 "This Train Don't Stop There Anymore" (TOTP, 2001)
 "Tinderbox" (BBC "In Session", St. Luke's, 2006 – outtake)
 "The Bridge" (a portion of the studio version)

Elton's New York Stories
 "Mona Lisas and Mad Hatters" (Royal Festival Hall, 1972)
 "Wouldn't Have You Any Other Way (NYC)" (BBC "In Session", St. Luke's, 2006 – outtake)
 "Empty Garden (Hey Hey Johnny)" (Hammersmith Odeon, 1982)
 "Believe" (Madison Square Garden, 1995)
 "We All Fall in Love Sometimes/Curtains" (Madison Square Garden, 2005)

Bonus CD (box set only)
 "Sixty Years On"
 "Ballad of a Well-Known Gun"
 "Where to Now St Peter?"
 "Holiday Inn"
 "Madman Across the Water"
 "Levon"
 "Hercules"
 "Mona Lisas and Mad Hatters"
 "Roy Rogers"
 "High Flying Bird"
 "Better Off Dead"
 "Empty Garden (Hey Hey Johnny)"
 "Something About the Way You Look Tonight"
 "The Bridge"
 "Burn Down the Mission"

Personnel 

 Elton John - piano, vocals
 Davey Johnstone - guitars, vocals
 Bob Birch - bass guitar, vocals
 Guy Babylon - keyboards
 John Mahon - percussion, vocals
 Nigel Olsson - drums, vocals
 Martin Tillman - cellist

Charts

Certifications

References

Elton John video albums
2007 live albums
2007 video albums
Live video albums
Elton John live albums
Albums recorded at Madison Square Garden
Films directed by David Mallet (director)